Charles Alden Seltzer (August 15, 1875 – February 9, 1942) was an American writer. He was a prolific author of western novels, had writing credits for more than a dozen film titles, and authored numerous stories published in magazines, most prominently in Argosy.

Life
Seltzer was born in Janesville, Wisconsin, the son of Lucien B. Seltzer and Oceania Hart of Columbus, Ohio. Before becoming a successful writer, he was variously a newsboy, telegraph messenger, painter, carpenter and manager of the circulation of a newspaper, building inspector, editor of a small newspaper, and an appraiser.

He married Ella Seltzer, and they had three sons and two daughters. His son, Louis B. Seltzer, later editor of the Cleveland Press, recalled that the family was quite poor when his father was struggling to break into the writing profession (he wrote two hundred stories before receiving an acceptance). During this time, Seltzer's wife brought him wrapping paper from the butcher to write on.

In addition to Argosy, Seltzer's work also appeared in Adventure,Short Stories, Blue Book,The Outing Magazine, Western Story Magazine  and
the US edition of Pearson's Magazine.

Seltzer wrote his westerns from the experience of five years living in New Mexico.  Towards the end of his life, he was also elected mayor of North Olmsted, Ohio, a Cleveland suburb, from 1930 to 1935.

 Works 

 The Council of Three (1900) – first book
 The Range Riders (1911)
 The Two-Gun Man (1911)
 The Triangle Cupid (1912)
 The Coming of the Law (1912)
 The Boss of the Lazy Y (1915)
 The Range Boss (1916)
 The Vengeance of Jefferson Gawne (1917)
 “Firebrand” Trevison (1918)
 The Ranchman (1919)
 The Trail to Yesterday (1919)
 The Trail Horde (1920)
 Beau Rand (1921)
 “Drag” Harlan (1921)
 West! (1922)
 The Way of the Buffalo (1924)
 Last Hope Ranch (1925)Trailing Back (1925)
 Channing Comes Through (1925)
 "Slow" Burgess (1926)
 Land of the Free (1927)
 The Mesa (1928)
 Mystery Range (1928)
 Brass Commandments (1928)
 The Valley of the Stars (1928)
 The Gentleman from Virginia (1928)
 The Red Brand (1929)
 The Raider (1929)
 Gone North (1930)
 A Son of Arizona (1931)
 Double Cross Ranch (1932)
 War On Wishbone Range (1932)
 Lonesome Ranch (1933)
 Clear the Trail (1933)
 West of Apache Pass (1934)
 Silver Spurs (1935)
 Kingdom in the Cactus (1936)
 Parade of the Empty Boots (1937)
 Treasure Ranch (1940)
 Arizona Jim (1942)
 So Long, Sucker'' (1943)

References

External links

 
 
 
 
 Charles Alden Seltzer holdings at openlibrary.org
 
 

1875 births
1942 deaths
Western (genre) writers
American male novelists
American male short story writers
People from Janesville, Wisconsin
Novelists from Wisconsin
Mayors of places in Ohio
People from North Olmsted, Ohio
Novelists from Ohio
American male screenwriters
20th-century American novelists
20th-century American short story writers
20th-century American male writers
Screenwriters from Ohio
Screenwriters from Wisconsin
20th-century American screenwriters
Pulp fiction writers